The Church of Santa Quiteria (Spanish: Iglesia Parroquial de Santa Quiteria) is a church located in Elche de la Sierra, Spain. It was declared Bien de Interés Cultural in 1992.

References 

Churches in Castilla–La Mancha
Bien de Interés Cultural landmarks in the Province of Albacete
18th-century Roman Catholic church buildings in Spain